François Roguet (12 November 1770 – 4 December 1846) became a French division commander in the Imperial Guard during the Napoleonic Wars. He enlisted in the French Royal Army in 1789. His regiment was assigned to the Army of Italy in 1792 and fought in the Italian campaigns of the French Revolutionary Wars. He commanded a battalion at the Battle of Rivoli in 1797. He was badly wounded at the Battle of Verona in 1799. For suppressing partisans he was promoted to command an infantry regiment.
 
Promoted general of brigade in 1803, Roguet fought at Elchingen and Scharnitz in 1805. He led his brigade at Jena and Magdeburg in 1806 and at Eylau and Guttstadt in 1807. He led a Young Guard brigade at Aspern-Essling and Wagram. He was in Spain in 1808 and 1810–1811. In the latter year he received promotion to general of division. In 1812 he directed the Young Guard at Battle of Krasnoi. In 1813 he led the Old Guard division at Lützen and Bautzen and a Young Guard division at Dresden and Leipzig. In 1814 he led a Young Guard division at Hoogstraten and Courtrai. In 1815 he led Imperial Guard troops at Ligny and Waterloo. After a period of retirement, he led a French division that intervened in the Belgian Revolution. His surname is one of the names inscribed under the Arc de Triomphe, on Column 26.

Career
In September 1800, the 33rd Line Infantry Demi-brigade was inspected in Paris by Napoleon Bonaparte. Only 37 officers and 295 soldiers remained of the unit and many men were barefoot and in ragged uniforms, because their clothing allotment had not been delivered. Napoleon circulated among the soldiers, recognizing veterans and recalling old victories. He ended the review by promoting Roguet the new commander and charging him to rebuild the unit to its former glory. The ranks were soon filled with apprehended draft evaders, recruits rejected by the cavalry and coastal artillery, deserters released from prison, and conscripts from the Eure department.

Notes

References

1770 births
1846 deaths
French generals
French military personnel of the French Revolutionary Wars
French commanders of the Napoleonic Wars
Military personnel from Toulouse
Counts of the First French Empire
Grand Croix of the Légion d'honneur
Burials at Père Lachaise Cemetery
Names inscribed under the Arc de Triomphe